Bachmanovo (Baćmanöv) is a rural locality (a village) and the administrative center of Chazyovskoye Rural Settlement, Kosinsky District, Perm Krai, Russia. The population was 124 as of 2010. There are 4 streets.

Geography 
Bachmanovo is located 27 km southwest of Kosa (the district's administrative centre) by road. Sredneye Bachmanovo is the nearest rural locality.

References 

Rural localities in Kosinsky District